The University of Iowa men's wrestling program is one of the most successful athletic programs in NCAA Division I. The University of Iowa Hawkeyes are a member of the Big Ten Conference. Iowa is second in NCAA history with 24 National Championships while finishing as a runner-up six times, with each of their championship appearances being since 1975.

History
Wrestling at the University of Iowa began in 1911 when the first head coach, E.G. Schroeder, led the team in a dual against Nebraska. The Hawkeyes competed in the first Big Ten meet in 1926 under the direction of coach Mike Howard. Howard coached Iowa from 1921 until 1952. David McCuskey took over for Howard and coached the team until 1972 when Gary Kurdelmeier began a four season reign where his teams had an impressive 51-7-5 record. Kurdelmeier led the Hawkeyes to their first national championship in his third year as coach.

Former Iowa State University wrestler and assistant coach Dan Gable, became The University of Iowa head coach in 1976. He was the Hawkeyes head coach for 17 NCAA Championships and 21 consecutive Big Ten Championships. That included a streak of nine consecutive NCAA Team Championships, starting in 1978 and ending in 1986. It equaled the longest streak of national titles won by any school, in any sport, also held by the Yale golf team (1905–13) and the Southern Cal track team (1935–43). In 1994 the University of North Carolina Women's Soccer team became the most recent addition to this group by winning its ninth straight NCAA championship which was also its 12th of a possible 13 (92%) since 1982 when the NCAA replaced the AIAW in awarding National Champion titles in collegiate Women's Soccer. The Hawkeyes also set NCAA records for total points (158), victory margin (73.25) and number of national champions (5), and tied the record for most finalists (6) in 1986.

Gable was so confident that his team would win their tenth straight championships that he had the Roman Numeral "X" put on their warm-up jackets to signify the tenth championships they thought they would win. However, they would finish as the runner-up at the 1987 NCAA Championships behind the Iowa State Cyclones, Gable's alma mater.

Gable retired after the 1997 season in which the team broke its own NCAA record for total points with its winning total of 170, and recorded the second-largest victory margin (56.50 points) in NCAA tournament history. The Hawkeyes also crowned five NCAA Champions out of six finalists, both tying NCAA records. Gable finished his Iowa head coaching career with a record of 355-21-5 (.940), 21 consecutive Big Ten Titles, and 15 NCAA Championships.

During Gable's reign, Iowa had numerous remarkable seasons.
Iowa had 9 All-American wrestlers in 1981, 1983, 1985, 1991, 1992, and 1995.
Iowa had 9 Big Ten champions in 1983.
Iowa had 5 national champions in 1986 and 1997.
Iowa beat Oklahoma State by at least 25 points in five separate dual meets, including a meet on Feb. 9, 1991 at which the Cowboys didn’t win a single match. Only a tied match by All-American Randy Couture prevented the shutout. Iowa won the meet 35-2.

He was replaced by Jim Zalesky, who had wrestled for Gable in the early eighties and had been his top assistant at Iowa for several years. Zalesky picked up right where Gable left off by winning the 1998 Big Ten and National championships. The following season, the Hawkeyes saw their 25-year Big Ten championship streak snapped by the Minnesota Golden Gophers. Nevertheless, Iowa was able to recover and defend their national championship.  In 2000, Zalesky's Hawkeyes returned to Big Ten championship form and also won their sixth consecutive national title and their third under Zalesky. However, the program would find itself struggling over the next six years, with Iowa winning only one Big Ten title in 2004 and no national championships. The Zalesky era came to an end after the 2005–06 campaign, a season which found the Hawkeyes slipping to fourth place in the final Big Ten tournament standings.

Iowa hired Tom Brands, another former Hawkeye wrestler who had also served as an assistant to Gable. Brands had been head coach at Virginia Tech prior to his return to Iowa City. In Iowa's first season under Brands, they would finish third in the Big Ten championships and eighth at the NCAA championships. The Hawkeyes rapidly returned to the national spotlight during the 2007–08 season, winning their first Big Ten championship in four years and their first NCAA championship in eight years and 21st national title overall.  Brent Metcalf and Mark Perry finished as National Champions and finalist Joey Slaton was a runner-up. They repeated as 2009 NCAA champions, despite having no individual champions, with five All-Americans. Brent Metcalf was a finalist and finished second. Ryan Morningstar finished third. Phil Keddy and Dan Erekson finished fourth. Dan Dennis finished seventh. Iowa returned to the NCAA championships with a dominant performance in 2010, having already locked up the team title before the end of the second day of competition. They finished with 3 individual champions, 2 runners-up, and eight overall All-Americans.  Matt McDonough won a National Championship as a freshman, while Brent Metcalf and Jay Borschel concluded their senior campaigns with National Championships. Dan Dennis finished second to Jayson Ness, of Minnesota, after losing the lead in the closing seconds of the match. Montell Marion, also, finished second, losing to freshman, and future four-time National Champ, Kyle Dake. Ryan Morningstar and Dan Erekson finished the season in seventh place, and Phil Keddy finished eighth.

Iowa's 2010 team was one of the most dominant in NCAA history. The team won all of its dual meets. Iowa shut out their opponents in eight of those duals, including Big Ten opponents Michigan, 36-0, Michigan State, 37-0, and Northwestern, 49-0. They also defeated Penn State, 29-6, Minnesota, 28-9, and Ohio State, 32-3.  This success continued into 2011 until the Hawkeyes' 69-match winning streak ended with a 15-15 tie v. rival Oklahoma State in Stillwater.  They continued this new "unbeaten streak" into 2012 finally ending in a 16-17 loss to Oklahoma State at home—ending a run of 84-0-1 going back to 2008.

Current roster 2022–2023

Home meets 

Home meets are held in the 15,500 seat Carver–Hawkeye Arena in Iowa City. Several home matches each year are televised by Iowa Public Television or the Big Ten Network.

On Dec 6, 2008, Iowa set the national dual-meet attendance record for wrestling with a crowd of 15,955 against Iowa State University. It was a matchup of the #1 and #2 ranked schools in the country, which Iowa won 20–15.

On November 14, 2015, #4 Iowa reset the national collegiate wrestling dual-meet attendance record at Kinnick Stadium with over 42,000 fans in a victory over #1 Oklahoma State. Years of planning went into the event and it was named Grapple on the Gridiron. Tom Brands came up with the idea in 2008, and broke the previous record set by Big Ten Conference rival Penn State in 2013.

Iowa continually has the best attendance per season. Since 2002, when attendance began being compiled, Iowa has led average home attendance nationally 19 out of 20 seasons, the lone exception being 2006 (Oklahoma State).

The University of Iowa wrestling program sold out of season tickets for the first time in program history in 2021. Iowa led the nation in attendance for the 14th consecutive season in 2019-20, setting an NCAA average attendance record of 12,568 fans in seven home dates. Official attendance records were not kept in 2020-21. The 2019-20 season marked the 12th straight that Iowa averaged more than 8,000 fans. It also marked the first time in NCAA history that a program put more than 10,000 fans in the building for every home dual.

Championships

NCAA team championships

Big Ten Team Championships
Iowa Big Ten Conference team titles: 1958, 1962, 1974, 1975, 1976, 1977, 1978, 1979, 1980, 1981, 1982,1983, 1984, 1985, 1986, 1987, 1988, 1989, 1990, 1991, 1992, 1993, 1994, 1995, 1996, 1997, 1998, 2000, 2004, 2008, 2009, 2010, 2015, 2020, 2021

Big Ten Regular Season Champions
The Hawkeyes have won or shared the Big Ten regular season championships 13 times since the conference started recognizing a dual meet champion in 1999. Iowa won the title outright in 2000, 2008, 2009, 2010, 2011, 2013, 2015 and 2020, and shared the title in 2003, 2014, 2016, 2019, and 2021.

NCAA individual champions 

Royce Alger	1987 1988
Ed Banach	1980 1981 1983
Lou Banach	1981 1983
Leslie Beers	1928
Jay Borschel	2010
Terry Brands	1990 1992
Tom Brands	1990 1991 1992†
Peter Bush	1982
Chris Campbell	1976 1977
Rico Chiapparelli	1987
Cory Clark 2017
Jim Craig	1959
Barry Davis	1982 1983 1985†
Kevin Dresser	1986
Lee Fullhart	1997
Duane Goldman	1986
Richard Govig	1954
Jim Heffernan	1986
Dan Holm 1975
Mark Ironside	1997 1998
Eric Juergens	2000 2001
Bruce Kinseth	1979†
Marty Kistler	1985 1986†
Gary Kurdelmeier 1958
Spencer Lee        2018 2019 2021
Kenneth Leuer	1956
Randy Lewis	1979 1980
Terry McCann	1955 1956
Matt McDonough	2010 2012
Jeff McGinness	1995 1998
Lincoln McIlravy	1993 1994 1997†
Brent Metcalf	2008† 2010
Steve Mocco	2003
Cliff Moore	2004
Brad Penrith	1986
Mark Perry         2007 2008
Tony Ramos (wrestler)	        2014
Mark Reiland	1991
Simon Roberts	1957
Joe Scarpello	1947 1950
Doug Schwab	1999
Joel Sharratt	1994
Dan Sherman	1973
Brad Smith	1976
Terry Steiner	1993†
Troy Steiner	1992
Derek St. John	2013
Sherwyn Thorson	1962
Daryl Weber	1996
Jessie Whitmer	1997
Joe Williams	1996 1997 1998†
T.J. Williams	1999 2001
Chuck Yagla	1975 1976†
Bill Zadick	1996
Jim Zalesky	1982 1983 1984†

†Denotes tournament most outstanding wrestler

Awards
Dan Hodge Trophy
1998 – Mark Ironside
2008 – Brent Metcalf
2020, 2021 – Spencer Lee

Iowa wrestling statistical leaders

SEASON WINS: 

1. Barry Davis (1981-82): 46
2. Tom Brands (1990-91): 45
3. Mark Reiland (1990-91): 44
T4. Barry Davis (1984-85), Terry Brands (1990-91): 43

CAREER WINS: 

1. Barry Davis (1981-85):162
2. Tom Brands (1988-92):158
3. Troy Steiner (1990-93): 148
4. Ed Banach (1980-83): 141
5. Terry Brands (1988-92): 137

SEASON PINS: 

1. Bruce Kinseth (1978-79): 23
T2. John Bowlsby (1976-77) & Ed Banach (1982-83): 22
4. Brent Metcalf (2008-09): 20
T5. Randy Lewis (1978-79; 1979-80), Ed Banach (1981-82), Royce Alger (1987-88) & Luke Moffitt (2001-02): 19

CAREER PINS: 

1. Ed Banach (1980-83): 73
2. Randy Lewis (1978-81): 64
3. John Bowlsby (1975-79): 59
T4. Rico Chiapparelli (1983-87), Royce Alger (1984-88), Jaydin Eierman (2017-19, 21,22): 49

Former wrestlers who have served as collegiate wrestling head coaches
Terry Brands 2002–2005, Tennessee-Chattanooga 2006-present, Iowa (Associate Head Coach)
Tom Brands 2005–2006, Virginia Tech/ 2007–present, Iowa
Barry Davis 1994–2018, Wisconsin
Kevin Dresser 2006–2017, Virginia Tech/2017-present, Iowa State
Tony Ersland 2014–present, Purdue
Duane Goldman 1992–2018, Indiana
Jim Heffernan 2009–present, Illinois
Steve Martin 2003–2020, Old Dominion
Keith Mourlam 1996-2004, Virginia Tech
Tony Ramos 2019-present, North Carolina (Associate Head Coach)
Greg Randall 2003–2017, Boise State
Tom Ryan 1995–2006 Hofstra/ 2007–present, Ohio State
Doug Schwab 2010–present, Northern Iowa
Joel Sharratt 2006–2013, Air Force/ 2014–2020, Navy
Troy Steiner 2016-2020, Fresno State
Jim Zalesky 1997–2006, Iowa / 2006–2020, Oregon State
Bob Riehm 1937-2020, Southern Oregon University 1969-1994

Athletics Hall of Fame

Notable Hawkeye wrestlers

 Royce Alger – former MMA fighter, World silver medalist in freestyle wrestling, two-time NCAA Champion and three-time All-American
 Ed Banach – Olympic gold medalist at 1984 Summer Olympics in freestyle wrestling, three-time NCAA Champion and four-time All-American 
 Lou Banach – Olympic gold medalist at 1984 Summer Olympics in freestyle wrestling, two-time NCAA Champion
 Terry Brands – Olympic bronze medalist at 2000 Summer Olympics in freestyle wrestling, two-time World Champion, two-time NCAA Champion and three-time All-American
 Tom Brands – Olympic gold medalist at 1996 Summer Olympics in freestyle wrestling, World Champion, three-time NCAA Champion and four-time All-American, has led Iowa to four national championships as a head coach
 Chris Campbell – Olympic bronze medalist at 1992 Summer Olympics, World gold and silver medals, two-time NCAA Champion and three-time All-American
 Rico Chiapparelli – former MMA fighter and trainer, NCAA Champion
 Barry Davis – Olympic silver medalist at 1984 Summer Olympics, two-time World medalist, three-time NCAA Champion and four-time All-American
 Daniel Dennis – Olympian at 2016 Summer Olympics in freestyle wrestling, NCAA finalist and two-time All-American
 Kevin Dresser – NCAA Champion and two-time All-American, head wrestling coach at Virginia Tech (2006–2017), Iowa State (2017–present)
 Thomas Gilman – Olympic bronze medalist at 2020 Summer Olympics in freestyle wrestling, World Champion and two-time medalist, NCAA finalist and three-time All-American
 Jordan Johnson – former UFC fighter
 Spencer Lee – two-time Junior World Champion and one-time Cadet World Champion in freestyle wrestling, three-time NCAA Champion
 Randy Lewis – Olympic gold medalist at 1984 Summer Olympics in freestyle wrestling, two-time NCAA Champion and four-time All-American
 Terrence McCann – Olympic gold medalist at 1960 Summer Olympics in freestyle wrestling, two-time NCAA Champion
 Matt McDonough – two-time NCAA Champion and three-time finalist
 Lincoln McIlravy – Olympic bronze medalist at 2000 Summer Olympics, two-time World medalist, three-time NCAA Champion and four-time finalist
 Brent Metcalf – former member of Team USA Freestyle World Team, two-time NCAA Champion and three-time finalist
 Steve Mocco – NCAA Champion and two-time finalist at Iowa
 Tony Ramos – former member of Team USA Freestyle World Team, NCAA Champion, two-time NCAA finalist and three-time All-American
 Doug Schwab – Olympian at 2008 Summer Olympics in freestyle wrestling, NCAA Champion and three-time All-American
 Joe Williams – Olympian at 2004 Summer Olympics in freestyle wrestling, two-time World bronze medalist, three-time NCAA Champion and four-time All-American
 Bill Zadick – 2006 World Champion in freestyle wrestling, NCAA Champion and two-time finalist
 Mike Zadick – Olympian at 2008 Summer Olympics, three-time NCAA All-American
 Jim Zalesky – three-time NCAA Champion and four-time All-American, led Iowa to three national championships as a head coach

See also
Iowa–Penn State wrestling rivalry
National Wrestling Hall of Fame and Museum
Glen Brand Wrestling Hall of Fame of Iowa

References

External links 

 
1911 establishments in Iowa
Sports clubs established in 1911